Ancteville is a former commune in the Manche department in the Normandy region in northwestern France. On 1 January 2019, it was merged into the new commune Saint-Sauveur-Villages.

Population

See also
 Communes of the Manche department

References

External links
 

Former communes of Manche